Frank S Cherry (circa 1875-1963) was the founder and leader of one of the early Black Hebrew Israelite groups in the United States.

Biography 
Little is known about Cherry's early and adult life, but we do know that he was born in the Southern United States. He did not go to school but educated himself in both Hebrew and Yiddish and worked as a sailor, during which he claims to have been declared a prophet. He was a 33rd Degree Scottish Rite Mason, and member of the Big Brothers organization. 

Cherry claimed to have a vision that African Americans are the descendants of the ancient Israelites, during his time  abroad. He then established and led a congregation in Chattanooga, Tennessee in 1886, where he preached that white people were inherently evil and hated by God. He would attempt to spread this belief in Philadelphia, Pennsylvania where he established the Church of God in 1915. Tenets of his group, known as the Church of the Living God, the Pillar Ground of Truth for All Nations, included Black Nationalism and support for Marcus Garvey. Cherry also espoused antisemitism, claimed that the earth is square, and professed that Jesus would return in the year 2000 to start a race war.

Cherry was from the Deep South and worked on ships and railroads before taking over a religious congregation. He taught that God, Jesus, Adam, and Eve were Black.

He established the Church of the Living God, the Pillar Ground of Truth for All Nations in 1886.

After his death, he was succeeded as the church's leader by his son Prince Benjamin F. Cherry.

Shais Rishon, a Black Orthodox Jewish writer and activist, stated that Cherry was "a southern Baptist who never belonged nor converted to any branch of Judaism."

See also
William Saunders Crowdy

References

Further reading
Black Gods of the Metropolis; Negro Religious Cults of the Urban North by Arthur Fauset, University of Pennsylvania Press, 1944

20th-century African-American people
Black Hebrew Israelite religious leaders
1963 deaths
Founders of new religious movements
Prophets